Francis J. Lantry (1859 - October 7, 1922) was appointed the fifth Fire Commissioner of the City of New York by Mayor George B. McClellan, Jr. on October 10, 1906 and served in that position until he resigned on February 10, 1908.

Biography
He was born in 1859 in New York City. He died on October 7, 1922 in Manhattan, New York City.

References

1859 births
1922 deaths
Lantry, Francis, J.